Luke Helliwell (born 1 March 1988 in Bradford) is an English professional rugby league footballer for the York City Knights. In 2006 he was named the Trevor Foster Award winner for the senior academy.

Career playing statistics

Point scoring summary

Matches played

References

1988 births
Living people
English rugby league players
Bradford Bulls players
Castleford Tigers players
Hunslet R.L.F.C. players
Rugby league players from Bradford
York City Knights players